Theo Wilson (born Theodora Nadelstein, May 22, 1917 – January 17, 1997) was an American reporter best known for her coverage of high-profile court cases for the Daily News of New York. She reported on the trials of Sam Sheppard, Patty Hearst, Sirhan Sirhan, Charles Manson, Jack Ruby, Angela Davis, David “Son of Sam” Berkowitz and Claus von Bulow.

She was born in New York City to Adolph and Rebecca Nadelstein. Adolph was the founder of Nadelstein Press. Her early publications include a story on the family's pet monkey for a national magazine, published when she was eight years old, and numerous poems, short stories, plays, and articles produced at Girls High School in Brooklyn. At the University of Kentucky, she worked at The Kentucky Kernel as a columnist and associate editor. After graduating Phi Beta Kappa in 1937, she was hired by the Evansville Press in Indiana and was soon promoted to tri-state editor. After working in Evansville, she moved to Indianapolis to marry television newscaster Bob Wilson and got a job on the Indianapolis Times. She later worked at the News Leader in Richmond, Virginia, where she began reporting on court cases, then at the Associated Press bureau in Philadelphia and the Philadelphia Bulletin before she and her husband moved back to her hometown of New York in 1952 and she was hired at the Daily News.

She covered many major trials for the Daily News, with enough of them taking place in California that the paper suggested she open a West Coast bureau. The Los Angeles bureau opened in 1973 with Wilson as the primary correspondent. One problem that arose for her in Southern California was that like many New Yorkers, she did not drive. In 1976, when a school bus driver and the 26 children in his care were kidnapped in a small town 200 miles north of Los Angeles, she hailed a taxi to take her there.

Following changes at the Daily News, Wilson accepted a buyout in 1982. She continued to write as a freelance journalist, covering trials for newspapers and cable television shows.

Wilson divorced Bob Wilson in 1960. They had a son, Delph, born in 1946. She later developed a relationship with fellow journalist Doc Quigg.

Her memoir, Headline Justice, was published in 1996. She died on January 17, 1997, in Los Angeles from a cerebral hemorrhage.

Theo Wilson Square, an intersection in the Hollywood Heights neighborhood of Los Angeles, where she lived for 25 years, was named for her in 1997.

Awards
 1972: Front Page Award for best news story on deadline

References

Journalists from New York City
1917 births
1997 deaths
20th-century American writers
University of Kentucky alumni
20th-century American journalists
American male journalists
Girls' High School alumni